Pentalonia is a genus of true bugs belonging to the family Aphididae.

The species of this genus are found in Central America, Southwestern Asia and Australia.

Species:

Pentalonia caladii 
Pentalonia gavarri 
Pentalonia nigronervosa

References

Aphididae